The Postgraduate Research Experience Survey (PRES) is a survey amongst graduate students at universities in the United Kingdom. It is developed by the Higher Education Academy. Participating institutions can collect feedback on the student experience and benchmark against their peers. The data is shared in a way so that comparisons (with the national average, for instance) are possible, but league tables cannot be constructed. The aim is to enhance the student experience. 

The equivalent for graduate students on taught courses is the Postgraduate Taught Experience Survey (PTES).

References

Educational research
Higher education data
Higher education in the United Kingdom 
Postgraduate education